Salvatore Lilli  was a Franciscan priest and a martyr killed by the Muslim Turks under Abdul Hamid on 22 November 1895.

Early life 
He was born on 19 June 1853 in Cappadocia, Abruzzo, Italy to Vincenzo and Annunziata Lilli. He joined Franciscan in 1870 and make his final vows on 6 August 1871.

Religious life 
He was ordained on 6 April 1878 in Bethlehem. He served as a missionary in Armenia. He also built schools, clinics and homes for abandoned. He taught modern hygiene and sanitation in villages. He worked with the sick during a cholera epidemic in 1891.

Persecution and death 
He was serving as a parish priest and superior of the Franciscan House at Mujukderesi, Turkey, at the time of death. He was arrested by Turks along with his seven companions and forced to embrace Islam, to which Lille and his companions refused and hence they were killed and their bodies desecrated and burned.

Beatification 
On 3 October 1982, Pope John Paul II beatified Salvatore Lilli and his companions. The feast day is celebrated on 19 November.

References 

19th-century Italian Roman Catholic priests
Italian beatified people
Beatifications by Pope John Paul II
1853 births
1895 deaths